Stygia hades is a species of moth of the family Cossidae. It is found on the Canary Islands, as well as in North Africa, including Morocco.

References

Moths described in 1924
Stygiinae